Floyd Elliott Rice (August 31, 1949 – November 8, 2011) was an American football linebacker who played eight seasons in the NFL for the Houston Oilers, San Diego Chargers, Oakland Raiders, and the New Orleans Saints.  He played college football at Alcorn State University.

References

1949 births
2011 deaths
American football linebackers
Alcorn State Braves football players
Houston Oilers players
San Diego Chargers players
Oakland Raiders players
New Orleans Saints players
Players of American football from Mississippi